Kaohsiung City's legislative districts consist of 8 single-member constituencies, each represented by a member of the Republic of China Legislative Yuan. From the 2020 election onwards, the number of Kaohsiung's seats was decreased from 9 to 8. This mandatory redistricting eliminated Kaohsiung City Constituency 9, and separated the previous Kaohsiung City Constituency 5 into three parts: West Sanmin to the new Kaohsiung City Constituency 5, Gushan and Yancheng to the new Kaohsiung City Constituency 6, and Cijin to the new Kaohsiung City Constituency 8.

Current districts

2020

Kaohsiung City Constituency 1 - Taoyuan, Namasia, Jiasian, Liouguei, Shanlin, Neimen, Cishan, Meinong, Maolin, Alian, Tianliao, Yanchao, Dashu, Dashe
Kaohsiung City Constituency 2 - Qieding, Hunei, Lujhu, Yongan, Gangshan, Mituo, Ziguan, Ciaotou
Kaohsiung City Constituency 3 - Zuoying, Nanzih
Kaohsiung City Constituency 4 - Renwu, Niaosong, Daliao, Linyuan
Kaohsiung City Constituency 5 - Sanmin, parts of Lingya
Kaohsiung City Constituency 6 - Gushan, Yancheng, Cianjin, Sinsing, Lingya
Kaohsiung City Constituency 7 - Fongshan
Kaohsiung City Constituency 8 - Siaogang, Cianjhen, Cijin

Historical districts

2008-2010
Kaohsiung County Constituency 1 - Taoyuan, Namasia, Jiasian, Liouguei, Shanlin, Neimen, Cishan, Meinong, Maolin, Alian, Tianliao, Yanchao, Dashu, Dashe
Kaohsiung County Constituency 2 - Qieding, Hunei, Lujhu, Yong'an, Gangshan, Mituo, Ziguan, Ciaotou
Kaohsiung County Constituency 3 - Renwu, Niaosong, Daliao, Linyuan
Kaohsiung County Constituency 4 - Fengshan
Kaohsiung City Constituency 1 - Zuoying, Nanzih
Kaohsiung City Constituency 2 - Gushan, Yancheng, Cijin, West Sanmin
Kaohsiung City Constituency 3 - East Sanmin
Kaohsiung City Constituency 4 - Cianjin, Sinsing, Lingya, parts of Cianjhen
Kaohsiung City Constituency 5 - Siaogang, Cianjhen

2010-2020
Kaohsiung City Constituency 1 - Taoyuan, Namasia, Jiasian, Liouguei, Shanlin, Neimen, Cishan, Meinong, Maolin, Alian, Tianliao, Yanchao, Dashu, Dashe
Kaohsiung City Constituency 2 - Qieding, Hunei, Lujhu, Yong'an, Gangshan, Mituo, Ziguan, Ciaotou
Kaohsiung City Constituency 3 - Zuoying, Nanzih
Kaohsiung City Constituency 4 - Renwu, Niaosong, Daliao, Linyuan
Kaohsiung City Constituency 5 - Gushan, Yancheng, Cijin, West Sanmin
Kaohsiung City Constituency 6 - East Sanmin
Kaohsiung City Constituency 7 - Cianjin, Sinsing, Lingya, parts of Cianjhen
Kaohsiung City Constituency 8 - Fengshan
Kaohsiung City Constituency 9 - Siaogang, Cianjhen

Legislators

Chen Chi-yu resigned in 2010 to take office as Kaohsiung City vice mayor.

Election results

References

Constituencies in Taiwan
Politics of Kaohsiung